Ellington Electronics Technology Group  依頓電子科技股份有限公司 (simply known as Ellington PCB or Eton) is one of the leading printed circuit board (PCB) manufacturers in China. It is a Hong Kong based company which is listed on the Shanghai Stock Exchange on 1 July 2014. In Year 2018, the company was ranked Top 10 in China and 41st in the world by revenue.

History 

Ellington was founded in March 2000, principally engaged in the manufacture and sale of high precision and density 2/L to 20/L printed circuit board. With in-house surface finishing of Organic Solderability Preservative (OSP), Lead-Free Hot Air Solder Leveling (HASL), Immersion Gold / Silver / Tin. It manufactures for over 400 customers worldwide. Ellington's world ranking jumped from 88th in 2005 to 41st in 2018.

Operations 

The company's headquarter and production facilities are located in Zhongshan City, Guangdong Province, China. The 4 storey manufacturing plant has a total area of 2,600,000 ft2. Ellington focusing on production quality management and control, with the mission of " Quality Is Life ", the company is ISO/TS16949, ISO 9002, ISO 14001 and OHSAS 18001 certified. After the completion of its 3rd stage capacity expansion, the company currently generates an output of 4,200,000 ft2 (390,600 m2) per month and currently employs more than 6,500 people.

Ellington also has a logistic facility and administration office located in Tsuen Wan, Hong Kong.

The company produces multilayered rigid PCBs that are used in various electronic equipment worldwide including consumer electronics, telecommunication, computer and Computer Peripherals, automotive industry, automation, power supply and electronic test equipment.

Future 

Ellington has completed the 4th Stage of capacity expansion, generating a further 500,000 ft2 capacity for Automotive Industry only in an isolated production plant. A total production output of 7,000,000 ft2 multilayer PCB will be generated by the 5th Stage of capacity expansion plan after listing on Shanghai Stock Exchange.

Major Customer Base 

Apple, Bose Corporation, Continental AG, Delphi Technologies, Flextronics, Huawei, Jabil Circuit, Lite-On, Preh, Robert Bosch GmbH, Wistron Corporation, Valeo and 200+ others.

References

Manufacturing companies established in 2000
Electronics companies of Hong Kong